Pat Pat Sat Sat Nhyoe is a 2017 Burmese drama film starring Nay Toe, Moe Set Wine and Shwe Htoo. The film, produced by the 7th Sense Film Production, premiered in Myanmar on 17 November 2017.

Cast
Nay Toe as Paing Soe Naing
Moe Set Wine as Hnin Pwint / Akari
Shwe Htoo as Yarza Bwar
Cho Pyone as Daw Nan Kyar Nyo
Ye Aung as U Nay La
Htoo Mon as Zay Ya Tu

References

2017 films
2010s Burmese-language films
Burmese drama films
Films shot in Myanmar
2017 drama films